The Hairy Head mansion (昴宿, pinyin: Mǎo Xiù) is one of the Twenty-eight mansions of the Chinese constellations.  It is one of the western mansions of the White Tiger.

This mansion corresponds to the Pleiades in English.

Asterisms

Chinese constellations